Busembatya, sometimes spelled Busembatia, is a town in the Eastern Region of Uganda.

Location
Busembatya is located on the northern edge of Iganga District. The town is located on the main Iganga–Tirinyi–Kamonkoli–Mbale Road.

The coordinates of the town are 0°46'30.0"N, 33°37'30.0"E (Latitude:0.7750; Longitude:33.6250).

Population
The Uganda national census of 2002 counted the population of the town at 11,553. In 2010, the Uganda Bureau of Statistics (UBOS) estimated the population at 15,200. In 2011, UBOS estimated the population at 15,700. In 2014, the national census and household survey, the population of Busembatya was enumerated at 14,431.

Overview
Busembatya, which sits on a plateau surrounded by swamps, is known for growing rice. Busembatya's rice mills served most of Busoga before other areas in the sub-region were connected to the national power grid.

The town's inhabitants and residents in the surrounding villages keep domestic livestock which they allow to roam the streets, unattended. The local leaders have threatened to arrest animal owners who cannot zero-graze their animals.

The town is home to Busembatya Town Council Football Club (Busembatya TC FC), which plays in the Federation of Uganda Football Associations (FUFA) Zone 10 mini soccer league.

See also
List of cities and towns in Uganda
Busoga sub-region

References

Iganga District
Populated places in Eastern Region, Uganda
Busoga